Let Go is an album by American fingerstyle guitarist and composer John Fahey, released in 1984. It was his first release on the Varrick label after over 25 years on his own label Takoma, as well as a few releases on other labels.

History
Since his move to Salem, Oregon in 1981, Fahey met guitarist and producer Terry Robb, who accompanies him on all but three of the songs on Let Go. He would work with Robb on three subsequent releases. Since his final album on Takoma (Railroad) Fahey had signed with Varrick Records, an imprint of Rounder Records. It was to be his first of four releases on the label.

His liner notes distance himself from the folk music label he had had since his career began. I'm not a Volk. I'm from the suburbs." He also noted the influence of the Brazilian guitarist Bola Sete. He had commented on Sete's influence in 1977 in the notes to his guitar transcription book The Best of John Fahey 1959–1977. He did his first cover of a Sete composition on his 1979 album John Fahey Visits Washington D.C..

He had previously recorded the "River Medley" on the 1972 Reprise release Of Rivers and Religion. "Dvorak" is based on themes from Antonín Dvořák Eighth and Ninth symphonies. Regarding the duo's cover of the Derek and the Dominos song "Layla", Fahey commented: "Talk about ambition, Chutzpah—that’s us."

The original LP lists a track titled "Lost Lake". There was never such a track.

Reception

Allmusic critic Richard Foss gave the album a 3 of 5 stars review, writing Let Go "may not be the definitive John Fahey album, but it is a very good one from end to end." CMJ New Music wrote that "you'll find this one to be subtley radiant, tropically blue and exceptionally calming."

Track listing
 "Let Go" [original title in Portuguese: Canto de Ossanha] (Baden Powell) – 6:34
 "Black Mommy" (Chargas, Martius) – 8:04
 "Dvořák" (Traditional) – 4:04
 "The World Is Waiting for the Sunrise" (Gene Lockhart, Ernest Seitz) – 2:30
 "Medley: Deep River/Ol' Man River" (Traditional, Oscar Hammerstein II, Jerome Kern) – 4:53
 "Lights Out" (John Fahey, Terry Robb) – 2:44
 "Pretty Afternoon" (Bola Sete) – 3:05
 "Sunset on Prince George's County" (Fahey) – 4:13
 "Layla" (Eric Clapton, Jim Gordon) – 5:15
 "Old Country Rock" (Traditional) – 1:20

Personnel
John Fahey – guitar
Terry Robb – guitar, bottleneck guitar on "Let Go," "Dvořák," River Medley," Lights Out," Pretty Afternoon," "Layla," and "Old Country Rock"
Johnny Riggins - percussion on "River Medley" and "Lights Out"
Ron "Dr." Manfredo - bass on "River Medley"
Production notes
Terry Robb – producer
Jack Barr – engineer
Jeff Rawson – assistant engineer
Glenn Berger – mastering
Melody Fahey – photography

References

1984 albums
John Fahey (musician) albums